Kepler-23c is a Neptune-sized exoplanet orbiting the star Kepler-23, located in the constellation Cygnus. The planet is 3.12 times wider than the Earth and is 0.189 Jupiter masses. The planet was discovered using data taken from Kepler spacecraft. It is likely a gas giant.

References 

Kepler-23
Exoplanets discovered by the Kepler space telescope
Exoplanets discovered in 2012
Transiting exoplanets

Cygnus (constellation)